The 2010 FIBA World Championship included 24 teams that competed in Turkey between August 28 and September 12, 2010.  Each team selected a squad of 12 players for the tournament.  Final squads for the tournament were due on August 26, two days before the start of competition.

Angola and the United States were the only teams made up of entirely domestic players (Jordan and Russia each had 11 domestic players).  Slovenia and Canada were the only teams composed entirely of players playing outside the domestic league, although at the time of the tournament Canada had no pro league exclusive to the country, instead competing in several U.S.-Canada cross-border professional and semi-professional leagues. Forty-one National Basketball Association players were selected to compete in the tournament, the most of any league.  In all, thirty countries had at least one player from their league system participate in the tournament.

Group A

Angola

Head coach:  Luís Magalhães

Argentina

Head coach:  Sergio Hernández

Australia

Head coach:  Brett Brown

Germany

Head coach:  Dirk Bauermann

Jordan

Head Coach:  Mário Palma

Serbia

Head Coach:  Dušan Ivković

Group B

Brazil

Head coach:  Rubén Magnano

Croatia

Head coach:  Josip Vranković

Iran

Head coach:  Veselin Matić

Slovenia

Head coach:  Memi Bečirovič

Tunisia

Head coach:  Adel Tlatli

United States

Group C

China

Head coach:  Bob Donewald

Ivory Coast

Head coach:  Randoald Dessarzin

Greece

Head coach:  Jonas Kazlauskas

Puerto Rico

Head coach:  Manolo Cintrón

Russia

Head coach:  /  David Blatt

Turkey

Head coach:  /  Bogdan Tanjević

Group D

Canada

Head coach:  Leo Rautins

France

Head coach:  Vincent Collet

Lebanon

Head coach:  /  Tab Baldwin

Lithuania

Head coach:  Kęstutis Kemzūra

New Zealand

Head coach:  /  Nenad Vučinić

Spain

Head coach:  Sergio Scariolo

Player statistics
The following tables list the player participation by national domestic league systems and the most represented clubs at the time of the tournament.  League totals include players playing in all levels of each country's basketball league system. Whenever possible, links go to the highest professional league of the associated country.

The United States' total includes 41 professional NBA players (three of whom played for the Toronto Raptors, based in Canada), seven amateur NCAA players, and one amateur NJCAA player.

The total for Australia includes four players on the New Zealand squad who played for the New Zealand Breakers, a team that has competed in Australia's National Basketball League since 2003. For consistency, the New Zealand total includes only players who competed in that country's National Basketball League.

Player representation by national domestic league

Player representation by club

See also
2010 Wheelchair Basketball World Championship squads

References

External links
FIBA World Championship Homepage
FIBA World Championship Team List

Squads
FIBA Basketball World Cup squads